Admiral Gregory may refer to:

David Gregory (Royal Navy officer) (1909–1975), British Royal Navy vice admiral
Francis Gregory (1789–1866), U.S. Navy rear admiral
Frederik Alexander Adolf Gregory (1814–1891), Royal Netherlands Navy vice admiral
Katherine L. Gregory (born 1951), U.S. Navy rear admiral
Michael Gregory (Royal Navy officer) (born 1945), British Royal Navy rear admiral